The FIVB Beach Volleyball U23 World Championship is a double-gender international beach volleyball tournament for athletes under the age of 23. The competition first took place in Myslowice, Poland in 2013. Thirty-six teams per gender entered the competition, making 72 in total.

Results summary

Men

Women

Medals table

References

Recurring sporting events established in 2013
U23
Beach
World youth sports competitions
Youth volleyball